Samuel Albert LeBlanc III (born November 12, 1938), is a Louisiana attorney who served as a Democrat in the Louisiana House of Representatives from 1972 to 1980.

On December 28, 1961, LeBlanc married Noelle Engler in Corpus Christi, Texas.

References

1938 births
Living people
Louisiana Democrats
Georgetown University alumni
Tulane University Law School alumni
People from Ascension Parish, Louisiana
Politicians from New Orleans
People from St. Francisville, Louisiana
Members of the Louisiana House of Representatives
Judges of the United States Court of Appeals for the Fifth Circuit
Peace Corps volunteers
American Roman Catholics
Lawyers from New Orleans
Catholics from Louisiana
Catholics from Colorado